Joel Williams (born December 13, 1956) is a former professional American football linebacker who played professionally in the National Football League (NFL) for the Atlanta Falcons and the Philadelphia Eagles from 1979 to 1989. As a Falcon in 1980, he led the National Football Conference (NFC) in quarterback sacks with 16. In 1983, he was traded from Atlanta to Philadelphia in exchange for the Eagles' second-round pick in the 1984 NFL Draft, and played for the Eagles from 1984 to 1986. After a contract dispute, he was traded back to Atlanta for a fifth-round pick in the 1986 NFL Draft and was reunited with Eagles' defensive coordinator Marion Campbell, who had been hired as the Falcons' head coach. Williams finished out the remainder of his career with the Falcons. He played college football at the University of Wisconsin–La Crosse.

References

External links
 

1956 births
Living people
American football linebackers
Atlanta Falcons players
Philadelphia Eagles players
Wisconsin–La Crosse Eagles football players
Players of American football from Miami